Baleix is a commune of the Pyrénées-Atlantiques department in the Nouvelle-Aquitaine region of south-western France.

The inhabitants of the commune are known as Baleichois or Baleichoises.

Geography
Baleix is located in the Montanérès overlooking the Lées Valley some 26 km north-east of Pau and 10 km south of Lembeye. Access to the commune is by the D7 road from Saint-Jammes in the west which passes through the length of the commune and the village and continues east to Casteide-Doat. The D145 comes from Lespourcy in the south-west and passes through the village to continue north to Anoye. Apart from the village there is also the hamlet of Tisné north-east of the village. The commune is mostly farmland with a few scattered small forests.

The Lées flows through the east of the commune from the south and continues north to join the Adour near Aire-sur-l'Adour. The Petit Lées comes from the south and flows north-east through the commune to join the Lées.

Places and hamlets

 Balespouey
 Baradat
 Berbouly
 Capcazaux
 Capsus (land)
 Castille
 La Caussade
 Clos
 Dujardin
 Guilhas
 Hourpelat
 Jeandavid
 Jouanolou
 La Moulère
 Noau
 Pucheu
 Puyo
 Sarthou
 Tisné
 Trémoulets
 Vignau

Neighbouring communes and villages

Toponymy
Michel Grosclaude said that etymologically the name comes from the Gascon Balèch meaning "plateau".

The following table details the origins of the commune name and other names in the commune.

Sources:
Raymond: Topographic Dictionary of the Department of Basses-Pyrenees, 1863, on the page numbers indicated in the table. 
Grosclaude: Toponymic Dictionary of communes, Béarn, 2006 
Cassini: Cassini Map from 1750

Origins:
Lescar: Cartulary of Lescar
Marca: Pierre de Marca, History of Béarn.
Fors de Béarn
Census: Census of Béarn
Terrier: The Terrier of Baleix.

History
Paul Raymond noted on page 20 of his 1863 dictionary that in 1385 there were 22 fires and it depended on the bailiwick of Pau. Baleix fief was subject to the Viscounts of Béarn.

The commune has long been occupied as evidenced by the discovery of a fortified camp surrounded by a moat with visible remains of earthworks.

During the medieval period the commune was a member of the Commandery of the Order of Malta of Caubin and Morlaàs.

Administration

List of Successive Mayors

Inter-communality
The commune is part of four inter-communal structures:
 the Communauté de communes du Nord-Est Béarn;
 the SIVOM of the Canton of Montaner;
 the Energy association of Pyrénées-Atlantiques;
 the inter-communal association for the supply of drinking water Luy-Gabas-Lees;

Demography
In 2017 the commune had 143 inhabitants.

Culture and heritage

Civil heritage
The commune has a number of buildings and structures that are registered as historical monuments:
A Farmhouse at Sarthou (18th century)
A House at Jean David (18th century)
A House at Castille (1623)
The Bourdallé House (18th century)
The Coulomé Farmhouse (1789)
The Bélengou House (18th century)
The Arnautou House at Clos (19th century)
Houses and Farms (17th-19th century)

Religious heritage

The Parish Church of Saint-Martin (12th century) is registered as an historical monument. The Church contains a very large number of items that are registered as historical objects.

See also
Communes of the Pyrénées-Atlantiques department

Bibliography
Archaeological Map of Gaul, Archaeological pre-inventory published under the responsibility of Michel Provost, Pyrénées-Atlantiques

References

External links

Baleix on the 1750 Cassini Map

Communes of Pyrénées-Atlantiques